Carlos José Correia de Azevedo is a Portuguese biologist specialising in microparasites of aquatic organisms, particularly Apicomplexa, Haplosporidia, Microsporidia, and Myxozoa.

Career
Carlos Azevedo is a retired Full Professor of the Abel Salazar Biomedical Sciences Institute, University of Porto, Portugal, where he taught Cell Biology until his retirement in 2004. After an initial focus on Spermatology (1972-1987), his research has focused on microparasites of aquatic organisms since 1985. He is a member of the Interdisciplinary Center of Marine and Environmental Research (CIIMAR/UP) of the University of Porto, as well as an Honorary member of Brazilian Society of Anatomy. Since 2009, Carlos Azevedo has been a Visiting Professor of the College of Science, King Saud University, Riyadh, Saudi Arabia.

Taxa described
Carlos Azevedo has described over 70 new taxa of microparasites, including:
 Abelspora portucalensis Azevedo, 1987, and the genus Abelspora itself
 Ceratomyxa auratae Rocha, Casal, Rangel, Castro, Severino, Azevedo & Santos, 2015
 Ellipsomyxa gobioides Azevedo, Videira, Casal, Matos, Oliveira, Al-Quraishy & Matos, 2013 
 Glugea arabica Azevedo, Abdel‑Baki, Rocha, Al‑Quraishy & Casal, 2016
 Haplosporidium edule Azevedo, Conchas & Montes, 2003
 Haplosporidium lusitanicum Azevedo, 1984
 Haplosporidium montforti Azevedo, Balseiro, Casal, Gestal, Aranguren, Stokes, Carnegie, Novoa, Burreson & Figueras, 2006
 Loma myrophis  Azevedo & Matos, 2002
 Nematopsis gigas Azevedo & Padovan, 2004
 Vavraia mediterranica Azevedo, 2001

References 

Living people
Portuguese biologists
Year of birth missing (living people)